The 2010–11 season is Hapoel Tel Aviv's 70th season in the Israeli Premier League. It was the second time the club participates in the qualification round of the UEFA Champions League, and the first ever qualification to the Group stage.

Ligat Ha'Al (Premier League) 
Kickoff times are in EET.

Regular season

Table

Top playoff

Table

Israel State Cup
Kickoff times are in EET.

UEFA Champions League
All times CEST (UTC+2)

Second qualifying round

Hapoel Tel Aviv won 6–0 on aggregate.

Third qualifying round

Hapoel Tel Aviv won 3–2 on aggregate.

Play-off round

Hapoel Tel Aviv won 4–3 on aggregate.

Group stage

Notes
Note 1: Played in Sarajevo at Asim Ferhatović Hase Stadium as Željezničar's Grbavica Stadium did not meet UEFA criteria.

See also
 2010–11 Israeli Premier League
 2010–11 Israel State Cup
 2010–11 UEFA Champions League

External links
 2010-11 Hapoel Tel Aviv F.C. season, Israel Football Association

Hapoel Tel Aviv F.C. seasons
Hapoel Tel Aviv
Hapoel Tel Aviv